The Burg Altenbaumburg, is a ruined castle above the municipality of Altenbamberg in Rhineland-Palatinate, Germany.

References

Castles in Rhineland-Palatinate
Ruined castles in Germany